Provincial Reconstruction Team Mazar-i-Sharif was a Provincial Reconstruction Team in Afghanistan, and was part of the NATO International Security Assistance Force (ISAF) mission.  Mazar-i-Sharif is a city in Balkh province which fell under the control of Regional Command North.  

Since 2006 the PRT's unit commanders were Swedish military officers, on loan to ISAF. It has ISAF-soldiers that are citizens of Sweden or Finland.

See also
2011 Mazar-i-Sharif attack
Afghan War order of battle
Provincial Reconstruction Team

References

Balkh Province
Mazar-i-Sharif